K237FR ("Olympia's 95.3 KGY") is a translator radio station licensed to Tumwater, Washington, which serves the Olympia, Washington region. It broadcasts with 220 watts at 95.3 FM, relaying the classic hits programming carried over the HD2 subchannel of KYYO in McCleary.

K237FR is a Class D translator, and was first licensed in 2014. It was initially used to provide an FM signal for KGY, 1240 AM in Olympia, Washington. (In order to avoid confusion, at this time co-owned KGY-FM in McCleary, Washington changed its call letters to KYYO.) Initially KGY's programming was retransmitted by KYYO-HD2, which was in turn retransmitted by K237FR.

Later in 2014, the original KGY on 1240 AM was sold to Sacred Heart Radio, which changed the station's call letters to KBUP. At this point there were no longer any stations officially assigned the KGY call letters by the Federal Communications Commission. However the "classic hits" format that formally originated at KGY continued to be broadcast by KYYO-HD2, using the slogan "Olympia's 95.3 KGY", and this programming continued to be simulcast by K237FR.

References

External links
"Olympia's KGY 95.3" official website

See also
 List of FM broadcast translators used as primary stations

Classic hits radio stations in the United States
237FR
Mass media in Olympia, Washington
Radio stations established in 2014